Alex or Alexander Burns may refer to:

 Alex Burns (footballer) (born 1973), former Scottish footballer
 Alex Burns (journalist), American political reporter for The New York Times
 Alexander Burns (minister) (1834–1900), Northern Ireland-born minister and educator in Canada

See also
 Sir Alexander Burnes (1805–1841), Scottish traveller and explorer